The Stadtschreiber von Bergen ('City clerk of Bergen') is an annual German literary award. The prize money is €20,000 with one year of free living in the town clerk's house in Bergen-Enkheim, Frankfurt, "An der Oberpforte 4". It was the first Stadtschreiber award in German-speaking countries and established in 1974. The Stadtschreiber has no obligations and can invite writers. A jury with nine members decides the winner.

Recipients

 1974/1975 Wolfgang Koeppen
 1975/1976 Karl Krolow
 1976/1977 Peter Rühmkorf
 1977/1978 Peter Härtling
 1978/1979 Nicolas Born
 1979/1980 Helga M. Novak
 1980/1981 Dieter Kühn
 1981/1982 Peter Bichsel
 1982/1983 Jurek Becker
 1983/1984 Günter Kunert
 1984/1985 Friederike Roth
 1985/1986 Ludwig Fels
 1986/1987 Gerhard Köpf
 1987/1988 Ulla Hahn
 1988/1989 Eva Demski
 1989/1990 Katja Lange-Müller
 1990/1991 Heinz Czechowski
 1991/1992 Robert Gernhardt
 1992/1993 Ralf Rothmann
 1993/1994 Paul Nizon
 1994/1995 Josef Winkler
 1995/1996 Herta Müller
 1996/1997 Wilhelm Genazino
 1997/1998 Jörg Steiner
 1998/1999 Arnold Stadler
 1999/2000 Wulf Kirsten
 2000/2001 Peter Kurzeck
 2001/2002 Wolfgang Hilbig
 2002/2003 Uwe Timm
 2003/2004 Emine Sevgi Özdamar
 2004/2005 Peter Weber
 2005/2006 Katharina Hacker
 2006/2007 Ingomar von Kieseritzky
 2007/2008 Reinhard Jirgl
 2008/2009 Friedrich Christian Delius
 2009/2010 Ulrich Peltzer
 2010/2011 Thomas Rosenlöcher
 2011/2012 Thomas Lehr
 2012/2013 Marcel Beyer
 2013/2014 Angelika Klüssendorf
 2014/2015 Dea Loher
 2015/2016 Ruth Schweikert
 2016/2017 Sherko Fatah
 2017/2018 Thomas Melle
 2018/2019 Clemens Meyer
 2019/2020 Anja Kampmann
 2020/2021 Anne Weber
 2021/2022 Dorothee Elmiger
 2022/2023 Marion Poschmann

References

External links

  

German literary awards
Awards established in 1974
Culture in Frankfurt